Route 408, also known as Cape Ray Road, is a highway on the west coast of Newfoundland in the Canadian province of Newfoundland and Labrador. Upon entering Route 408, motorists would travel only  before entering its only community, Cape Ray. Because of its short length, plus being a rough road, the maximum speed limit is set at 50 km/h.

Near Cape Ray, was a former Canadian National Railway train station known as Red Rocks. It closed down in September 1966, supposedly following completion of the Trans-Canada Highway in Newfoundland.

Major intersections

References

408